Grimmer is a civil parish in Restigouche County, New Brunswick, Canada.

For governance purposes it is part of the incorporated rural community of Kedgwick, which is a member of the Restigouche Regional Service Commission.

Before the 2023 governance reform, the local service district (LSD) of White's Brook straddled the eastern boundary of the parish along Route 17. Most of the parish formed the LSD of the parish of Grimmer until its merger with the village of Kedgwick on 1 July 2012 to form the rural community.

Origin of name
The parish was named in honour of W.C.H. Grimmer, former Surveyor General and Attorney General of New Brunswick.

History
Grimmer was erected in 1916 from Eldon Parish. Grimmer included Saint-Quentin Parish.

In 1921 Saint-Quentin was erected as its own parish.

Boundaries
Grimmer Parish is bounded:

 on the north by the Quebec provincial border, running through the Patapedia and Restigouche Rivers;
 on the east by a line beginning at the mouth of Upper Thorn Point Brook and running south-southeasterly through the former Intercolonial Railway station at Whites Brook;
 on the south by a line running along the southern line of a grant to Paul Berube on the eastern side of Route 17, about 3 kilometres north of Chemin 36 No. 1 and its prolongations east to the Eldon Parish line and west to the Restigouche River;
 on the west by a line running due north to the provincial border.

Communities
Communities at least partly within the parish. All communities except Whites Brook are part of the incorporated rural community of Kedgwick. italics indicate a name no longer in official use

 Kedgwick
 Kedgwick River
 Michaud
 Petit-Ouest
 Petite-Réserve
 Quatre-Milles
 Rang-Double-Nord
 Rang-Double-Sud
 Rang-Sept
 Red Bank
 Six-Milles
 Thibault
  Tracy Depot
 Whites Brook

Bodies of water
Bodies of water at least partly within the parish.
 Little Main Restigouche River
 Patapedia River
 Restigouche River
 Lac à Morin

Islands
Islands at least partly within the parish.
 Downs Gulch Islands
 Half Mile Island
 Little Cross Point Islands
 Tracy Island
 Whites Brook Islands

Other notable places
Parks, historic sites, and other noteworthy places at least partly within the parish.
 Blueberry Brook Protected Natural Area
 Downs Gulch Aerodrome
 Downs Gulch Protected Natural Area
 Kedgwick Wildlife Management Area
 Stillwater Brook Protected Natural Area
 Upper Thorn Point Brook Protected Natural Area

Demographics

Population

Language

Access Routes
Highways and numbered routes that run through the parish, including external routes that start or finish at the parish limits:

Highways

Principal Routes
None

Secondary Routes:

External Routes:
None

See also
List of parishes in New Brunswick
Little Main Restigouche River

Notes

References

Former parishes of New Brunswick
Neighbourhoods in New Brunswick